The Jack Pine Conference is a high school athletic conference in northern lower Michigan made up of Class B and C schools.  The sports involved include: Football, Basketball, Baseball, Softball, Wrestling, Volleyball, Bowling, Track and Field, Cross Country, and Golf.

Membership changes (1982–2019)

Evart was the first to leave the JPC since its foundation in 1972; Coleman would be the second to do so, leaving in 2002.

Due to declining enrollment, Roscommon and Houghton Lake departed the JPC for the Highland Conference at the start of the 2019–20 academic year. Taking the place of both Roscommon County schools, Pinconning and Shepherd joined the conference at the start of the 2019-2020 academic year. Both departed from the Tri-Valley Conference.

Members

Membership timeline

State championships
Jack Pine Conference member high schools have won the following Michigan High School Athletic Association state championships:

Football

Baseball

Softball

Boys Track and Field

Girls Track and Field

Boys Bowling

Girls Bowling

Conference Records

References

 Jack Pine Conference
 2017-18 MHSAA Enrollment List

Michigan high school sports conferences
High school sports conferences and leagues in the United States
Education in Michigan